Jakob Breum Martinsen (born 17 November 2003) is a Danish footballer currently playing as a winger for Odense Boldklub.

Career statistics

Club

Notes

References

2003 births
Living people
Danish men's footballers
Denmark youth international footballers
Association football forwards
Danish Superliga players
Næsby Boldklub players
Odense Boldklub players